Cabell City is a ghost town and former mining town in Grant County, Oregon.

History
Cabell City was established in the 1880s by Fred E. and John B. Cabell, who operated the La Bellevue Mine. No post office was established, and Cabell City was never a "city" in any sense of the word. All that remains of the settlement is the cemetery, which houses the graves of Fred and Johanna Cabell and their 8-year-old daughter, as well as a few abandoned buildings and mining equipment.

References

Unincorporated communities in Grant County, Oregon
Unincorporated communities in Oregon
1880s establishments in Oregon
Ghost towns in Oregon